Anthony Forrest was a politician.

Anthony Forrest may also refer to:

Anthony Alexander Forrest (1884–1901), Australian rules footballer
Anthony Forrest, actor in The Mark of Archanon

See also
Anthony Forest (disambiguation)